The Exchange is a novel by Yuri Trifonov. It is the first volume of Trifonov's cycle of Moscow novels written in "urban prose", and portraying the everyday lives of Muscovite dwellers.

References

1969 novels
Novels by Yury Trifonov